The Culgoa National Park is a protected national park that is located in the north-west region of New South Wales, in eastern Australia. The park's northern boundary is defined by part of the state border between New South Wales and Queensland.

The Culgoa River flows through the national park.

The spirit of the history and culture of the Aboriginal people, who mostly worked as colonial pastoralists, can be felt here. The whole area of the park is full of relics of the pastoral and grazing industry of that time.

Features
The national park, with its impressive river red gums and  expansive floodplains, is the landscape that is thought to be representative of the Australian outback. The iconic coolabah tree, a native species, covers large sections of the park. In fact, no other national park in New South Wales has an area larger than the Culgoa's coolabah woodlands.

The park has numerous mammals, including the Common brushtail possum and Little pied bat (Chalinolobus picatus), a species of bat endemic to Australia.

The Culgoa National Park's birds present an irresistible lure for birdwatchers, who can glimpse many of the park's total of over 150 species. These include 10 species of honeyeaters and six of Australia's woodswallows.

See also

 Protected areas of New South Wales

References

External links
 

National parks of New South Wales
Protected areas established in 1996
1996 establishments in Australia
North West Slopes